Bjarne Johannes Hope (30 March 1944 - 30 June 2006) was a Norwegian civil servant.

He was born in Masfjorden. Having graduated from the Norwegian Institute of Technology in 1968 as siv.ing., he worked as a consultant from 1972. From 1995 to his death in 2006 he served as director of the Norwegian Tax Administration.

Shortly before his death he was awarded the Order of St. Olav. He was the brother of Einar Hope.

References

1944 births
2006 deaths
People from Masfjorden
Directors of government agencies of Norway
Norwegian Institute of Technology alumni
20th-century Norwegian engineers
20th-century Norwegian civil servants
21st-century Norwegian engineers